Erbium is a chemical element with the symbol Er and atomic number 68. A silvery-white solid metal when artificially isolated, natural erbium is always found in chemical combination with other elements. It is a lanthanide, a rare-earth element, originally found in the gadolinite mine in Ytterby, Sweden, which is the source of the element's name.

Erbium's principal uses involve its pink-colored Er3+ ions, which have optical fluorescent properties particularly useful in certain laser applications. This process results in an unusually mechanically simple laser optical amplifier for signals transmitted by fiber optics. The  wavelength is especially important for optical communications because standard single mode optical fibers have minimal loss at this particular wavelength.

In addition to optical fiber amplifier-lasers, a large variety of medical applications (i.e. dermatology, dentistry) rely on the erbium ion's  emission (see Er:YAG laser) when lit at another wavelength, which is highly absorbed in water in tissues, making its effect very superficial. Such shallow tissue deposition of laser energy is helpful in laser surgery, and for the efficient production of steam which produces enamel ablation by common types of dental laser.

Characteristics

Physical properties

A trivalent element, pure erbium metal is malleable (or easily shaped), soft yet stable in air, and does not oxidize as quickly as some other rare-earth metals. Its salts are rose-colored, and the element has characteristic sharp absorption spectra bands in visible light, ultraviolet, and near infrared. Otherwise it looks much like the other rare earths. Its sesquioxide is called erbia. Erbium's properties are to a degree dictated by the kind and amount of impurities present. Erbium does not play any known biological role, but is thought to be able to stimulate metabolism.

Erbium is ferromagnetic below 19 K, antiferromagnetic between 19 and 80 K and paramagnetic above 80 K.

Erbium can form propeller-shaped atomic clusters Er3N, where the distance between the erbium atoms is 0.35 nm. Those clusters can be isolated by encapsulating them into fullerene molecules, as confirmed by transmission electron microscopy.

Like most rare-earth elements, erbium is usually found in the +3 oxidation state. However, it is possible for erbium to also be found in the 0, +1 and +2 oxidation states.

Chemical properties
Erbium metal retains its luster in dry air, however will tarnish slowly in moist air and burns readily to form erbium(III) oxide:
4 Er + 3 O2 → 2 Er2O3

Erbium is quite electropositive and reacts slowly with cold water and quite quickly with hot water to form erbium hydroxide:
2 Er (s) + 6 H2O (l) → 2 Er(OH)3 (aq) + 3 H2 (g)

Erbium metal reacts with all the halogens:
2 Er (s) + 3 F2 (g) → 2 ErF3 (s) [pink]
2 Er (s) + 3 Cl2 (g) → 2 ErCl3 (s) [violet]
2 Er (s) + 3 Br2 (g) → 2 ErBr3 (s) [violet]
2 Er (s) + 3 I2 (g) → 2 ErI3 (s) [violet]

Erbium dissolves readily in dilute sulfuric acid to form solutions containing hydrated Er(III) ions, which exist as rose red [Er(OH2)9]3+ hydration complexes:

2 Er (s) + 3 H2SO4 (aq) → 2 Er3+ (aq) + 3  (aq) + 3 H2 (g)

Isotopes 

The primary decay mode before the most abundant stable isotope, is electron capture, and the primary mode after is beta decay. The primary decay products before  are element 67 (holmium) isotopes, and the primary products after are element 69 (thulium) isotopes.

Compounds

Oxides

Erbium(III) oxide (also known as erbia) is the only known oxide of erbium, first isolated by Carl Gustaf Mosander in 1843, and first obtained in pure form in 1905 by Georges Urbain and Charles James. It has a cubic structure resembling the bixbyite motif. The Er3+ centers are octahedral. The formation of erbium oxide is accomplished by burning erbium metal. Erbium oxide is insoluble in water and soluble in mineral acids.

Halides

Erbium(III) fluoride is a pinkish powder that can be produced by reacting erbium(III) nitrate and ammonium fluoride. It can be used to make infrared light-transmitting materials and up-converting luminescent materials. Erbium(III) chloride is a violet compounds that can be formed by first heating erbium(III) oxide and ammonium chloride to prouce the ammonium salt of the pentachloride ([NH4]2ErCl5) then heating it in a vacuum at 350-400 ºC. It forms crystals of the  type, with monoclinic crystals and the point group C2/m. Erbium(III) chloride hexahydrate also forms monoclinic crystals with the point group of P2/n (P2/c) - C42h. In this compound, erbium is octa-coordinated to form  ions with the isolated  completing the structure.

Erbium(III) bromide is a violet solid. It is used, like other metal bromide compounds, in water treatment, chemical analysis and for certain crystal growth applications. Erbium(III) iodide is a slightly pink compound that is insoluble in water. It can be prepared by directly reacting erbium with iodine.

Organoerbium compounds

Organoerbium compounds are very similar to those of the other lanthanides, as they all share an inability to undergo π backbonding. They are thus mostly restricted to the mostly ionic cyclopentadienides (isostructural with those of lanthanum) and the σ-bonded simple alkyls and aryls, some of which may be polymeric.

History 

Erbium (for Ytterby, a village in Sweden) was discovered by Carl Gustaf Mosander in 1843. Mosander was working with a sample of what was thought to be the single metal oxide yttria, derived from the mineral gadolinite. He discovered that the sample contained at least two metal oxides in addition to pure yttria, which he named "erbia" and "terbia" after the village of Ytterby where the gadolinite had been found. Mosander was not certain of the purity of the oxides and later tests confirmed his uncertainty. Not only did the "yttria" contain yttrium, erbium, and terbium; in the ensuing years, chemists, geologists and spectroscopists discovered five additional elements: ytterbium, scandium, thulium, holmium, and gadolinium.

Erbia and terbia, however, were confused at this time. A spectroscopist mistakenly switched the names of the two elements during spectroscopy. After 1860, terbia was renamed erbia and after 1877 what had been known as erbia was renamed terbia. Fairly pure Er2O3 was independently isolated in 1905 by Georges Urbain and Charles James. Reasonably pure erbium metal was not produced until 1934 when Wilhelm Klemm and Heinrich Bommer reduced the anhydrous chloride with potassium vapor. It was only in the 1990s that the price for Chinese-derived erbium oxide became low enough for erbium to be considered for use as a colorant in art glass.

Occurrence 

The concentration of erbium in the Earth crust is about 2.8 mg/kg and in seawater 0.9 ng/L. Erbium is the 44th most abundant element in the Earth's crust at about 3.0–3.8 ppm.

Like other rare earths, this element is never found as a free element in nature but is found bound in monazite sand ores. It has historically been very difficult and expensive to separate rare earths from each other in their ores but ion-exchange chromatography methods developed in the late 20th century have greatly brought down the cost of production of all rare-earth metals and their chemical compounds.

The principal commercial sources of erbium are from the minerals xenotime and euxenite, and most recently, the ion adsorption clays of southern China; in consequence, China has now become the principal global supplier of this element. In the high-yttrium versions of these ore concentrates, yttrium is about two-thirds of the total by weight, and erbia is about 4–5%. When the concentrate is dissolved in acid, the erbia liberates enough erbium ion to impart a distinct and characteristic pink color to the solution. This color behavior is similar to what Mosander and the other early workers in the lanthanides would have seen in their extracts from the gadolinite minerals of Ytterby.

Production
Crushed minerals are attacked by hydrochloric or sulfuric acid that transforms insoluble rare-earth oxides into soluble chlorides or sulfates. The acidic filtrates are partially neutralized with caustic soda (sodium hydroxide) to pH 3–4. Thorium precipitates out of solution as hydroxide and is removed. After that the solution is treated with ammonium oxalate to convert rare earths into their insoluble oxalates. The oxalates are converted to oxides by annealing. The oxides are dissolved in nitric acid that excludes one of the main components, cerium, whose oxide is insoluble in HNO3. The solution is treated with magnesium nitrate to produce a crystallized mixture of double salts of rare-earth metals. The salts are separated by ion exchange. In this process, rare-earth ions are sorbed onto suitable ion-exchange resin by exchange with hydrogen, ammonium or cupric ions present in the resin. The rare earth ions are then selectively washed out by suitable complexing agent. Erbium metal is obtained from its oxide or salts by heating with calcium at  under argon atmosphere.

Applications 

Erbium's everyday uses are varied. It is commonly used as a photographic filter, and because of its resilience it is useful as a metallurgical additive.

Lasers and optics
A large variety of medical applications (i.e. dermatology, dentistry) utilize erbium ion's  emission (see Er:YAG laser), which is highly absorbed in water (absorption coefficient about ). Such shallow tissue deposition of laser energy is necessary for laser surgery, and the efficient production of steam for laser enamel ablation in dentistry.

Erbium-doped optical silica-glass fibers are the active element in erbium-doped fiber amplifiers (EDFAs), which are widely used in optical communications. The same fibers can be used to create fiber lasers. In order to work efficiently, erbium-doped fiber is usually co-doped with glass modifiers/homogenizers, often aluminum or phosphorus. These dopants help prevent clustering of Er ions and transfer the energy more efficiently between excitation light (also known as optical pump) and the signal. Co-doping of optical fiber with Er and Yb is used in high-power Er/Yb fiber lasers. Erbium can also be used in erbium-doped waveguide amplifiers.

Other applications
When added to vanadium as an alloy, erbium lowers hardness and improves workability. An erbium-nickel alloy Er3Ni has an unusually high specific heat capacity at liquid-helium temperatures and is used in cryocoolers; a mixture of 65% Er3Co and 35% Er0.9Yb0.1Ni by volume improves the specific heat capacity even more.

Erbium oxide has a pink color, and is sometimes used as a colorant for glass, cubic zirconia and porcelain. The glass is then often used in sunglasses and cheap jewelry.

Erbium is used in nuclear technology in neutron-absorbing control rods. or as a burnable poison in nuclear fuel design. Recently, erbium has been used in experiments related to lattice confinement fusion.

Biological role and precautions
Erbium does not have a biological role, but erbium salts can stimulate metabolism. Humans consume 1 milligram of erbium a year on average. The highest concentration of erbium in humans is in the bones, but there is also erbium in the human kidneys and liver. Erbium is slightly toxic if ingested, but erbium compounds are not toxic. Metallic erbium in dust form presents a fire and explosion hazard.

References

Further reading
 Guide to the Elements – Revised Edition, Albert Stwertka (Oxford University Press; 1998), .

External links 

 It's Elemental – Erbium

 
Chemical elements
Chemical elements with hexagonal close-packed structure
Ferromagnetic materials
Lanthanides
Reducing agents